Idaho Legislative District 14 is one of 35 districts of the Idaho Legislature. It is currently represented by Cecil Scott Grow, Republican  of Eagle, Mike Moyle, Republican of Star, and Gayann DeMordaunt, Republican of Eagle.

District profile (1992–2002) 
From 1992 to 2002, District 14 consisted of a portion of Ada County.

District profile (2002–2012) 
From 2002 to 2012, District 14 consisted of  a portion of Ada County.

District profile (2012–2022) 
District 14 currently consists of a portion of Ada County.

District profile (2022–) 
Beginning in December 2022, District 14 will consist of Gem County and a portion of Ada County.

See also

 List of Idaho Senators
 List of Idaho State Representatives

References

External links
Idaho Legislative District Map (with members)
Idaho Legislature (official site)

14
Ada County, Idaho